Madhusūdana Sarasvatī (c.1540–1640) was an Indian philosopher in the Advaita Vedānta tradition and devotee of Lord Krishna. He was the disciple of Viśveśvara Sarasvatī and Mādhava Sarasvatī, and is the most celebrated name in the annals of the great debate between Dvaita and Advaita schools of Vedanta. The Nyayamruta of Vyasatirtha, a text criticising the Advaita view, caused a furore in the Advaita community resulting in a series of scholarly debates over centuries. Madhusūdana composed Advaitasiddhi, a line-by-line refutation of Nyayamruta. In response to Advaitasiddhi, the Dvaita scholars, Vyasa Ramacharya, and Ananda Bhattaraka, wrote Nyayamruta Tarangini and Nyayamruta Kantakoddhara and challenged Madhusūdana Sarasvatī.

Birth and Education
Madhusūdana was born in a staunch Vaishnava Brahmin family in a village named Unashia situated in the Kotalipara division of Gopalganj district near Faridpur in Bangladesh to a Sanskrit scholar named Pramod Purandara Acharya, and originally called Kamalanayana.  He was educated in the Navya-Nyāya tradition at Nabadwip under reputed scholars of those days like Harirama Tarkavagisha & Mathuranath Tarkavagisha, but later undertook sannyasa from an sannyāsi of Dashanami Sampradaya named Vishvesvara Sarasvati, and moved to Varanasi in order to study Advaita Vedanta.

Works

Madhusūdana wrote a number of works, all involving the defence and exposition of Advaita Vedānta, of which the largest and most respected is the Advaitasiddhi, which opposes the Dvaita Vedānta positions and arguments in Vyāsatīrtha's work Nyāyāmṛta.  Madhusūdana also wrote at least nine other works, of which five were commentaries (on the Bhagavadgīta, on parts of the Bhāgavatapurāņa, and others).  He wrote the Īśvarapratīpatti-prakāś, Vedāntakalpalatikā, Sārasangraha on Sarvajñātmā's Saṅkṣēpa-śārīrika, and the justly famous Siddhāntabindu on Śaṅkarācārya's Daśaślokī.

A total of twenty-one books have been ascribed to Madhusūdana. Of them, nineteen books are undoubtedly his, but the authorship of the remaining two is doubtful. Twelve of his books are on philosophy, the rest are poems, plays and miscellaneous themes. The philosophical books include commentaries.

List of Works
Advaita-siddhi (अद्वैतसिद्धिः) 
Advaita-manjari (अद्वैतमञ्जरी)(?)
Advaita-ratna-raksana (अद्वैतरत्नरक्षणम्)
Atma-bodha-tika (आत्मबोधटीका)
Ananda-mandakini (आनन्दमन्दाकिनी)
Prasthanabheda (प्रस्थानभेदः) 
Bhagavad-gita-gudhartha-dipika (भगवद्गीता-गूढार्थदीपिका)
Vedanta-kalpa-latika (वेदान्तकल्पलतिका)  
Sastra-siddhanta-lesa-tika (शास्त्रसिद्धान्तलेशटीका)
Samksepa-sariraka-sara-samgraha (सङ्क्षेपशारीरकसारसङ्ग्रहः)
Siddhanta-tatva-bindu (सिद्धान्ततत्त्वबिन्दुः / सिद्धान्तबिन्दुः)
Pramahamsa-priya (परमहंसप्रिया - भागवताद्यश्लोकव्याख्या) 
Veda-stuti-tika (वेदस्तुतिटीका)
Asta-vikriti-vivarana (अष्टविकृतिविवरणम्)
Rajanam-prtibodha(?)
Isvara-pratipatti-prakasa (ईश्वरप्रतिपत्तिप्रकाशः)
Bhagavata-bhakti-rasayana (भगवद्भक्तिरसायनम्)
Krishna-kutuhala-nataka (कृष्णकुतूहलम्)
Bhakti-samanya-nirupana (भक्तिसामान्यनिरूपणम्) (?)
Sandilya-sutra-tika (शाण्डिल्यभक्तिसूत्रटीका)
Hari-lila-vakhya (हरिलीलाव्याख्या)
shivamahimnastotra-TIkA (शिवमहिम्नःस्तोत्रटीका)

Quotes on Madhusudana Saraswati
Madhusūdana was so accomplished in Navya Nyaya (New logic) techniques that the following verse is quoted about him when he visited Navadvipa, the center for learning in Nyaya Shastra,

Meaning:   When MadhusUdana, the master of speech, came to navadvIpa, MathurAnAtha tarkavAgIsha (who was the foremost navya naiyAyika during those times) trembled (with fear) and GadAdhara (another logician of great repute) became afraid.

A few words about the authors. MadhusUdana sarasvatI is a towering giant among advaitins. An oft quoted verse regarding him is,

Meaning:   (Only) the Goddess of Learning, Sarasvati knows the limits of (knowledge of) Madhusūdana Sarasvati. And Madhusūdana Sarasvati knows the limits of (knowledge of) Goddess Sarasvati.

Follower of Bhakti Yoga
Madhusūdana Sarasvatī was a great devotee of Lord Krishna. Just like Appayya Dikshita, who integrated Sivādvaita into advaita vedanta, Madhusūdana bridged the sAtvata school of Pancaratra Vaishnavism and Advaita Vedanta philosophy. Madhusūdana boldly differs from Adi Sankara in some of his interpretations of the Brahma Sutras and the Gītā, although he salutes Adi Sankara and Suresvara in the most reverential terms. Tradition also recounts that Viṭṭhalesa, the son of Vallabhacharya of the Suddhadvaita school, studied under Madhusūdana Sarasvatī, who thus forms a crucial link between Advaita Vedanta and many Vaiṣṇava sects in the north.

It is also mentioned at some places that Madhusūdana Sarasvatī was one of the major judge on whether,Tulsi das ji's Ramcharit Manas", written in AWADHI,should be allowed or should it be discontinued. Madhusūdana Sarasvatī favoured the idea of allowing "Ramcharit Manas". This is also seen asa major achievement towards popularising the BHAKTI movement.Being an Advaitin,this was considered a bold step in those days.

Relation with Akbar

According to a Dashanami legend, Madhusudana Sarasvati complained to the Mughal emperor Akbar about Muslim attacks on Hindu ascetics. Akbar's courtier Birbal suggested that Sarasvati initiate non-Brahmin members in his group and arm them. This legend has been passed down through oral tradition, and its historicity is not confirmed by historical texts. However, J. N. Farquhar believed that it had some historical basis.

There seems to be a coincidental historical data, that might provide a debatable proof to the above fact. Immediately after Madhusudan Saraswati's return from Agra, the "Naga-sanyasis" (naked- Sages) did form an assembly in Varanasi and did defend the Hindu pilgrims (or Sanatani pilgrims) from the dastardly attacks of the Muslim warriors.

However at this moment, not enough 'conclusive  proof is present of any direct link between "Madhusudan-Saraswati" and the formation of the "Naga" groups.

Sources and further reading
Karl H. Potter, "Madhusūdana Sarasvatī" (in Robert L. Arrington [ed.]. A Companion to the Philosophers. Oxford: Blackwell, 2001. )
Sarvepalli Radhakrishnan, et al. [edd], History of Philosophy Eastern and Western: Volume One (George Allen & Unwin, 1952)
Surendranath Dasgupta, Madhusūdana Sarasvatī (a.d. 1500), A history of Indian Philosophy, volume 2

References

Advaitin philosophers
Saraswati, Madhusudana
1540 births
1640 deaths
17th-century Indian philosophers
16th-century Indian philosophers
16th-century Hindu religious leaders
Scholars from Varanasi
16th-century Hindu philosophers and theologians
17th-century Hindu philosophers and theologians